Sir Francis Joseph Kitts (1 May 1912 – 16 March 1979) was a New Zealand politician. He was the longest-serving mayor of Wellington, holding the post from 1956 to 1974.

Early life
Kitts was born in Waimate, the son of an Australian quarryman, and attended Marist Brothers primary school alongside his half-brother John before completing his education at Timaru Boys' High School. He was an active athlete and was a talented swimmer also having an interest in both boxing and rugby. He was a firm believer in physical fitness and had a lifelong twice-a-day exercise regimen. Whilst still at high school he joined the Timaru branch of the Labour Party at 16, with his father's encouragement, and was branch president at from 1936 to 1938. In 1938 Kitts stood unsuccessfully for the Timaru Borough Council as a Labour candidate. Kitts enlisted in the Royal New Zealand Air Force in July 1940 during World War II and served for five years with the home forces as a staff sergeant. Whilst posted in Ōtaki he met Iris Woodcock at the local racecourse and the two married in 1949. The couple had no children.

Following the war he moved to Wellington, and worked as a civil servant for the Government Stores Board. He became the vice-president of the Wellington Central branch of the Labour Party in 1947. He was a competent debater and was a team leader for the Wellington Metropolitan Debating Club. He held Saturday morning talks along a walking route down Bowen Street Lambton Quay and Willis Street with residents from all around Wellington, which earned him a public reputation in the city. Kitts walked the route nearly every day for the next 25 years.

Newspaper reports after his death say he was a "man of mystery" as little is known about his early life, and his Who's Who in New Zealand entries in 1971 and 1978 both start with his election to Wellington local bodies in 1950. His brother, Father John Kitts, who was chaplain at the Villa Maria Convent in Brisbane, stated that Kitts seldom spoke of his private life and his wife Iris was the only person who truly knew him.

Political career

Local-body politics
At the 1950 local-body elections the Labour Party had no obvious mayoral candidate, and Labour activist Gerald O'Brien suggested to Kitts should stand. He likewise stood for the Wellington City Council, Wellington Harbour Board and Wellington Hospital Board. He polled far better than expected for the mayoralty, but was defeated by Robert Macalister of the Citizens' Association. He was however elected to the City Council, Harbour Board and Hospital Board. In 1953 he stood again for all four offices but was again defeated by Macalister for the mayoralty. His popularity had grown significantly and was not only re-elected to the three local bodies, but topped the poll for all three, gaining more votes than any other candidate the first time this had been achieved in Wellington history.

In 1956 Kitts was elected mayor on his third attempt, exploiting a split vote on the centre-right with Macalister running as an independent after losing the Citizens' Association nomination to Ernest Toop. He became Wellington's first Labour mayor in 46 years. He would remain Wellington's mayor for the next 18 years. In 1962 he recorded the highest ever number of votes in a mayoral election in Wellington. In 1969 he surpassed Thomas Hislop to become Wellington's longest serving mayor. He was unexpectedly defeated by a narrow margin in 1974 by Michael Fowler. The result was so close that several re-counts were required before the final result was known, ending Kitts' record tenure as mayor, though he was still re-elected as a member of the Harbour Board.

As mayor Kitts travelled overseas as an ambassador for the city and made a point of visiting every city named Wellington in the world. In 1971 he visited Antarctica. Like Norman Kirk, also from Waimate, he was "a big man, using his imposing six foot two inch, 17 stone frame to overshadow his opponents."

He also served on the Wellington Fire Board from 1954, and the Wellington Hospital Board from 1950 to 1956, and the Wellington Harbour Board from 1950 until his death in 1979. He was also the chairman of the Wellington City and Suburban Water Supply Board, director of the New Zealand Municipalities Co-operative Insurance Company and patron of the City of Wellington Highland Pipe Band.

Member of Parliament

He was also speculated as a potential successor to Peter Fraser in the 1951 Brooklyn by-election but declined to stand. He was to hold the seat to 1960, when he was unexpectedly defeated by the National candidate Dan Riddiford. He later failed to win back the electorate in 1963. Given his mayoral experience the press speculated he was a likely candidate for the role of either Speaker of the House of Representatives or Chairman of Committees after the formation of the Second Labour Government. He was appointed to neither and remained a backbencher. During the government's term, Kitts was one of a group of three Labour MPs (the others being Mick Moohan and Bill Fox) who were deeply critical of the decisions made in the "Black Budget". Kitts' brother said that not remaining in Parliament longer had been his biggest regret.

Post mayoralty
To the surprise of most, the Third Labour Government did not appoint him to any higher office. Labour city councillor Joe Aspell said "Thousands expected Frank Kitts to be given something to make use of his considerable ability". He did become President of the Sporting Clubs Association of New Zealand.

In a surprise move, Kitts attempted a political comeback in 1977. He was again defeated by Fowler with his vote share falling further, though contrarily his vote increased for the Harbour Board, to which he was again elected. A Dominion editorial said of Kitts' candidature "No one knew what Frank Kitts did during his three years in the political wilderness and no one knew why he wanted to come back".

Death
Kitts died suddenly on 16 March 1979, aged 67, collapsing at his home after completing a morning shopping trip with his wife. His funeral was held in St Mary of the Angels and attracted over 400 mourners. Tributes were given by Kitts' successor as mayor Michael Fowler and former prime minister Bill Rowling among others. Following the service his body was taken in a civic cortège along his famous walking route along Willis Street, Lambton Quay and Bowen Street to Karori Cemetery where he was buried.

He was still a member of the Harbour Board at his death. A by-election was avoided when Terry Brandon, the highest polling unsuccessful candidate from the 1977 election, was appointed to fill Kitts' vacant seat.

Frank Kitts Park

Frank Kitts Park on Wellington's waterfront is named after him. The park, on the site formerly used for a row of wharf sheds, was opened in 1976 and after redevelopment reopened in 1990.

Honours
Kitts was known for his tireless public service, which continued after his retirement, including helping Wellington's immigrant community. In the 1966 New Year Honours, he was appointed a Knight Bachelor for services as mayor of Wellington. In the 1975 Queen's Birthday Honours, Kitts' wife, Iris, Lady Kitts, was appointed an Officer of the Order of the British Empire, for services to the community as mayoress of Wellington between 1956 and 1974.

The Kitts Trophy for Impromptu Speaking is awarded by the Wellington Speaking Union every year. The trophy is named after Kitts, who donated it in 1967 to encourage excellence in impromptu speaking.

Notes

References

 Who's Who in New Zealand (1961, 7th edition)

External links
Frank Kitts, candidate, in 1950 (photo) 
The Duke of Edinburgh and Frank Kitts in 1956 (photo 1) 
The Duke of Edinburgh and Frank Kitts in 1956 (photo 2) 
Cartoon of Frank Kitts & Michael Fowler in 1974

1912 births
1979 deaths
Mayors of Wellington
Wellington City Councillors
New Zealand Labour Party MPs
New Zealand Knights Bachelor
New Zealand MPs for Wellington electorates
People from Waimate
People educated at Timaru Boys' High School
Members of the New Zealand House of Representatives
Wellington Harbour Board members
Wellington Hospital Board members
Unsuccessful candidates in the 1949 New Zealand general election
Unsuccessful candidates in the 1951 New Zealand general election
Unsuccessful candidates in the 1960 New Zealand general election
Unsuccessful candidates in the 1963 New Zealand general election
New Zealand politicians awarded knighthoods
Burials at Karori Cemetery
New Zealand military personnel of World War II